Earl F. "Click" Clark (1891 – April 10, 1959) was an American football player and coach.

College
Clark lettered at the University of Washington in 1912.
He then lettered at the University of Montana from 1914 to 1916 as a 152-pound end. At Montana, he was a captain of the football team and an "all-star northwest" end for three seasons, after which he enlisted in the United States Navy in 1917.

Coaching
Clark served as the head coach at the University of Montana from 1924 to 1925, the second alum to do so. He then became a trainer at the University of Washington in 1926 until his retirement.

Awards
 Everett High School Coaches hall of fame.
 Seattle Sports Man of the Year (1941)  
 Washington Husky Hall of Fame
 National Athletic Trainers' Association hall of fame

Head coaching record

References

External links
 NATA profile
 

1891 births
1959 deaths
American football ends
Montana Grizzlies football coaches
Montana Grizzlies football players
Washington Huskies football coaches
Washington Huskies football players
High school basketball coaches in Washington (state)
Sportspeople from Everett, Washington
Players of American football from Washington (state)
United States Navy personnel of World War I